Anthony Boatswain is a politician from Grenada.  A member of the New National Party, he served for a time in the office of prime minister Keith Mitchell before being elected to the House of Representatives of Grenada.  He has also served as Minister of Finance, Trade, Industry and Planning, and more recently as Minister for Economic Development and Planning.

References
Candidate profile on party website

Year of birth missing (living people)
Living people
Members of the House of Representatives of Grenada
New National Party (Grenada) politicians
Finance ministers of Grenada
20th-century Grenadian politicians
21st-century Grenadian politicians